Shayna Nackoney Skauge (born April 24, 1982) is a Canadian synchronized swimmer.  She began synchronized swimming in 1989. She won a bronze medal at the team event at the 2001 world championships in Fukuoka, Japan. She was a member of the 2004 Canadian Olympic Synchronized Swimming Team. She then went on to perform with the O Show in Las Vegas. Shayna now is a mentor and coach to athletes and synchronized swimming clubs coaching and leading performance focused workshops. Shayna's commitment to life long athleticism and sport is ongoing. Information as of November 2021

Personal life
Born in Winnipeg, Manitoba, Skauge is an alumna of Bishop Carroll High School.

References

1982 births
Living people
Olympic synchronized swimmers of Canada
Synchronized swimmers at the 2004 Summer Olympics
Swimmers from Winnipeg
Canadian synchronized swimmers
World Aquatics Championships medalists in synchronised swimming
Pan American Games medalists in synchronized swimming
Synchronized swimmers at the 2003 Pan American Games
Pan American Games silver medalists for Canada
Medalists at the 2003 Pan American Games
20th-century Canadian women
21st-century Canadian women